The 1904 United States presidential election in Pennsylvania took place on November 8, 1904 as part of the 1904 United States presidential election. Voters chose 34 representatives, or electors to the Electoral College, who voted for president and vice president.

Pennsylvania overwhelmingly voted for the Republican nominee, President Theodore Roosevelt, over the Democratic nominee, former Chief Judge of New York Court of Appeals Alton B. Parker. Roosevelt won Pennsylvania by a landslide margin of 40.67%. His record is the best presidential performance in Pennsylvania since the Era of Good Feelings, when nearly unopposed Democratic-Republicans often carried the state by landslide margins. and Parker carried just 6 rural counties largely populated either by Pennsylvania German voters historically opposed to the Civil War and to the pietism of the Republican Party, or by Appalachian mountaineers sympathetic to the South in that war. Roosevelt was the first ever Republican victor in the historically Democratic counties of Northampton and Sullivan in the anti-Yankee northeast and German Lutheran York in the Appalachian south.

Results

Results by county

See also
 List of United States presidential elections in Pennsylvania

Notes

References

Pennsylvania
1904
1904 Pennsylvania elections